Events in 2005 in Japanese television.

Debuts

Ongoing shows
Music Fair, music (1964-present)
Mito Kōmon, jidaigeki (1969-2011)
Sazae-san, anime (1969-present)
FNS Music Festival, music (1974-present)
Panel Quiz Attack 25, game show (1975-present)
Soreike! Anpanman. anime (1988-present)
Downtown no Gaki no Tsukai ya Arahende!!, game show (1989-present)
Crayon Shin-chan, anime (1992-present)
Shima Shima Tora no Shimajirō, anime (1993-2008)
Nintama Rantarō, anime (1993-present)
Chibi Maruko-chan, anime (1995-present)
Detective Conan, anime (1996-present)
SASUKE, sports (1997-present)
Ojarumaru, anime (1998-present)
One Piece, anime (1999–present)
Pocket Monsters Advanced Generation, anime (2002-2006)
Naruto, anime (2002–2007)
Konjiki no Gash Bell!!, anime (2003-2006)
Tottoko Hamtaro: Ham Ham Paradise!, anime (2004-2006)
Initial D Fourth Stage, anime (2004-2006)
Yu-Gi-Oh! Duel Monsters GX, anime (2004-2008)
Sgt. Frog, anime (2004-2011)
Bleach, anime (2004-2012)

Hiatus

Endings

See also
2005 in anime
2005 Japanese television dramas
2005 in Japan
List of Japanese films of 2005

References